The longicorn beetle Phoracantha obscura is a species of beetle native to Australia.

Description
Males are between 13 and 28 mm while females are 14 to 29 mm. The head, pronotum and elytra vary from blackish brown to dark reddish brown, and the elytra have two yellow fascia. Antennal segments 3 to 10 have apical spines.

References

 
 

Beetles of Australia
Phoracanthini